John Sinnich OFM, (1603-1666) was an Irish-born priest who was professor of theology at the University of Louvain.

He wrote the index to the Augustinus, Cornelius Jansen's posthumously published work, and following the controversy, he tried to argue that Jansenism conformed with the church's teachings and cleared from censure. As a result he was accused of being a Jansenist.

Born in 1603 to Maurice Sinnich and Eleanor Hogan, in County Cork, Ireland, and he was educated at the University of Louvain. He matriculated in 1624, gained a Masters in 1625, and his doctorate in 1637. Ordained a priest he also served as canon of the cathedral of Bruges.
He was appointed professor in Louvain in 1637, Dr. Sinnich also held the position of Rector of the College. He served as president of the College of the Holy Spirit in 1641. He was in Rome from 1643-45 as a delegate for the College.

He died in Louvain on 6 May 1666.

Publications
 Saul ex-Rex sive de Saule, israeliticae gentis protomonarcha, divinitus primum sublimato, ac deinde ob violatam religionem principatu vitaque exuto, by John Sinnich, Lovanii, 1662.
 Molinomachia, hoc est Molinistarum in Augustinum Jansenii Antistis Iprensis insultus novissimus, Jean Sinnich, Paris, 1650.
 Sanctorum Patrum de Gratia Christi and libero arbitrio dimicantium Trias, Augustinus Hipponensis, Prosper Aquitanus, Fulgentius Ruspensis adversus Pelagium, Cassianum, Faustum. Quorum propria verba sine ullo additamento summa fide referuntur, by John Sinnich, 1648.

References

1603 births
1666 deaths
People from County Cork
17th-century Irish Roman Catholic theologians
17th-century Irish Roman Catholic priests
Irish expatriates in Belgium
Old University of Leuven alumni
Academic staff of the Old University of Leuven